The Cars North American Tour Spring 2011 is a set of eleven concerts in the United States and Canada featuring the newly reunited American band The Cars. Announced in April 2011 prior to the release of the band's album Move Like This, the concerts feature material from Move Like This and from the band's 1970s and 1980s albums. 

Singer/guitarist Ric Ocasek, keyboardist Greg Hawkes, guitarist Elliot Easton and drummer David Robinson performed as a quartet, as original Cars singer and bassist Benjamin Orr died in 2000. Orr's bass parts were performed by Hawkes on keyboard and bass, while the vocals on songs originally sung by Orr ("Just What I Needed", "Let's Go" and "Moving in Stereo") were performed by Ocasek. As Ocasek died on September 15, 2019, this is the final tour from the band.

Tour dates

Reception
The performances and set lists were met with mixed reviews: The Hollywood Reporter reviewer Erik Pedersen found Move Like This to be a "surprisingly good" album but described the Hollywood Palladium show as "icy" and unenthusiastic. San Jose Mercury News reviewer Jim Harrington described the band's performance at Oakland's Fox Theater as "incredibly flat and dispassionate", but praised the band's "solid" musicianship.

Band members
Ric Ocasek – lead vocals, guitar
Elliot Easton – guitars, backing vocals
Greg Hawkes – keyboards, bass, backing vocals
David Robinson – drums, backing vocals

References

External links 
 The Cars - Official Site

The Cars concert tours
2011 concert tours
2011 in American music
Concert tours of North America
May 2011 events in North America
Farewell concert tours